George Baldwin (January 22, 1830 – December 7, 1907) was a Wisconsin politician and businessman.

Born in St. Johnsbury, Vermont, Baldwin studied law, and was admitted to the Vermont bar. He moved to Calumet County, Wisconsin, where he practiced law. He was mayor of Chilton, Wisconsin, and county judge of Calumet County. He served in the Wisconsin State Assembly in 1866 and was elected to the Wisconsin State Senate in 1870. He moved to Appleton, Wisconsin in order to manage his real estate holdings. He died in Appleton, leaving an estate valued at nearly $5 million.

Notes

People from St. Johnsbury, Vermont
People from Chilton, Wisconsin
Politicians from Appleton, Wisconsin
Wisconsin state court judges
Mayors of places in Wisconsin
Democratic Party members of the Wisconsin State Assembly
Democratic Party Wisconsin state senators
1830 births
1907 deaths
19th-century American politicians
19th-century American judges